Michael Howe is an American politician serving as the North Dakota Secretary of State. Elected in November 2022, he assumed office on January 1, 2023.

Education 
Howe earned a Bachelor of Science degree in broadcast journalism and mass communication from North Dakota State University in 2010.

Career 
In 2011 and 2012, Howe served as a legislative correspondent and legislative assistant for Congressman Rick Berg. He also served as an agricultural policy advisor to Berg. In 2013, he was the director of legislative affairs and communications director for the North Dakota Corn Growers Association. He was elected to the North Dakota House of Representatives in November 2016 and assumed office on December 1, 2016. Howe served as a member of the House Water Topics Overview Committee.

In January 2022, Howe declared his candidate for North Dakota secretary of state in the 2022 election. The incumbent secretary, Alvin Jaeger, retired after seven terms in office.

References 

|-

 

 

Living people
Republican Party members of the North Dakota House of Representatives
North Dakota State University alumni
Secretaries of State of North Dakota
Year of birth missing (living people)